The 2019 Auckland local elections took place between September and October 2019 by postal vote as part of nation-wide local elections. The elections were the fourth since the merger of seven councils into the Auckland Council, which is composed of the mayor and 20 councillors, and 149 members of 21 local boards. Twenty-one district health board members and 41 licensing trust members were also elected.

Mayoral election

The incumbent mayor, Phil Goff, sought a second term and was re-elected ahead of second highest polling candidate John Tamihere.

Governing body elections
Twenty members were elected to the Auckland Council, across thirteen wards, using the first past the post vote system.

The Auckland Future ticket, holding four local body seats since 2016, announced in March 2019 that it would not field candidates.

Mike Lee, sitting councillor for Waitemata and Gulf ward, announced in late-June 2019 that he would run again. The City Vision ticket, which had endorsed Lee since 1998, had selected Pippa Coom as its candidate in March 2019.

The final candidate list was released on 19 August.

Rodney ward (1)

Incumbent Greg Sayers was the only nomination.

Albany ward (2)

Incumbents Walker and Watson both ran for re-election under the ticket "Putting People First".

North Shore ward (2)

Incumbents Darby and Hills both sought re-election.

Waitākere Ward (2)
Of the two incumbents, Linda Cooper sought re-election and Penny Hulse retired.

Waitemata and Gulf ward (1)
Incumbent Mike Lee sought re-election.

Whau ward (1)
Incumbent Ross Clow sought re-election.

Albert-Eden-Roskill ward (2)
Incumbents Casey and Fletcher both sought re-election.

Maungakiekie-Tamaki ward (1)
Incumbent Josephine Bartley sought re-election.

Manukau ward (2)
Incumbents Collins and Filipaina both sought re-election.

Manurewa-Papakura ward (2)
Of the two incumbents, Daniel Newman sought re-election and John Walker retired.

Franklin ward (1)
Incumbent Bill Cashmore was the only nomination.

Ōrākei ward (1)
Incumbent Desley Simpson sought re-election.

Howick ward (2)
Incumbents Stewart and Young both sought re-election.

Licensing Trust elections
35 Members were elected to 5 licensing trusts across Auckland.

Birkenhead Licensing Trust (6)

Mt Wellington Licensing Trust (6)

Portage Licensing Trust

Ward No 1 – Auckland City (3)
{| class="wikitable" style="width:51%;"
|-
! colspan="2" style="width:1%;" | Affiliation (if any)!! style="width:20%;" |Name !! style="width:15%;"| Votes 
|-
|bgcolor=| || City Vision (Auckland political ticket)|City Vision||Catherine Farmer|| 5074|-
|bgcolor=| || City Vision (Auckland political ticket)|City Vision||Margi Watson||4734 
|-
|bgcolor=| ||City Vision||Kurt Taogaga|| 3646
|-
|bgcolor=| || Community First || Kathryn Davie|| 3631
|-
|bgcolor=| || Community First || Paul Davie|| 3366
|-
|bgcolor=| || Trusts Action Group || Sam Learmonth|| 3080
|-
|bgcolor=| ||Communities & Residents|| Shefali Mehta || 2946
|-
| || || Informal/blank ||  -
|}

Ward No 2 – New Lynn (2)

Ward No 3 – Glen Eden (2)

Ward No 4 – Titirangi / Green Bay (2)

Ward No 5 – Kelston West (1)

Waitakere Licensing Trust

Ward No 1 – Te Atatū (2)

Ward No 2 –Lincoln (3)

Ward No 3 – Waitakere (1)

Ward No 4 – Henderson (1)

Wiri Licensing Trust (6)

Term-end performance assessment
	
Bernard Orsman and Simon Wilson, the local government reporters from The New Zealand Herald, both assessed the performance of each elected member at the end of the term. Their ratings, from 1 to 10 (worst to best), were compiled without them comparing notes. Orsman and Wilson are known to be at opposing end of the political spectrum. Seven out of their twenty-one ratings are identical. Orsman assigned rates from 3 to 8, while Wilson had councillors rated from 1 to 10.

References

Politics of the Auckland Region
Mayoral elections in Auckland
Auckland